With Body & Soul is an LP album by Julie London, released by Liberty Records under catalog number LRP-3514 as a monophonic recording and catalog number LST-7514 in stereo in 1967. Kirk Stuart served as pianist and arranger.

One highlight of this collection is the Jimmy Radcliffe and Buddy Scott composed song "Treat Me Good",  also recorded by Lu Elliott (1968), Irene Reid (1976) and an un-issued version from its co-author Jimmy Radcliffe (1968).

Track listing

Notes

References

Liberty Records albums
1967 albums
Julie London albums